Heath Wesley Francis, OAM (born 16 November 1981 in Newcastle, New South Wales is an Australian athlete who has participated in the 2000, 2004 and 2008 Summer Paralympics. His right arm was amputated at the age of seven as a result of a mincing accident on his family farm in Booral, New South Wales.

Professional career 
At the 2008 Beijing Paralympics he became the first arm amputee athlete to win the sprint treble (100m, 200m and 400m events) at a Paralympics, a feat he accomplished 2 years earlier at the 2006 IPC World Championships. 
He competes in the T46 classification for arm amputees, where he is the current 200m (21.74s) & 400m (47.63s) World Record holder. Both World Record times were run at the 2008 Beijing Paralympics.
In 2000, his competitive sport participation was sponsored by the New South Wales WorkCover.

He received a Medal of The Order of Australia for his 2000 gold medals. He also received an Australian Sports Medal in 2000 and a Centenary Medal in 2001. He was an Australian Institute of Sport scholarship holder from 2003 to 2010 and was coached by Irina Dvoskina. In 2014, he was inducted into the Sydney Olympic Park Athletic Centre Path of Champions.

Personal life 
Heath Francis completed his Bachelor of Commerce and Bachelor of Business Degrees from the University of Newcastle (2000–2007) whilst training at the Australian Institute of Sport.

He currently works for Westpac Bank. He also had joined charity organization like CARE Australia and The Australian Himalayan Foundation.

As an ambassador for Good Return,  Francis join Charity event like Sun run, had raised more than $17,000 for funding training and consumer protection work to give people living in poverty the chance to grow their incomes safely and effectively.

References

External links
 Heath Francis at Australian Athletics Historical Results
 Good Return
 Sun run

Living people
Paralympic athletes of Australia
Athletes (track and field) at the 2000 Summer Paralympics
Athletes (track and field) at the 2004 Summer Paralympics
Athletes (track and field) at the 2008 Summer Paralympics
Paralympic gold medalists for Australia
Paralympic silver medalists for Australia
Paralympic bronze medalists for Australia
Recipients of the Medal of the Order of Australia
Recipients of the Australian Sports Medal
Recipients of the Centenary Medal
Australian Institute of Sport Paralympic track and field athletes
1981 births
World record holders in Paralympic athletics
Medalists at the 2000 Summer Paralympics
Medalists at the 2004 Summer Paralympics
Medalists at the 2008 Summer Paralympics
Sprinters with limb difference
Australian amputees
Commonwealth Games medallists in athletics
Commonwealth Games gold medallists for Australia
Athletes (track and field) at the 2006 Commonwealth Games
Paralympic medalists in athletics (track and field)
Australian male sprinters
Paralympic sprinters
Medallists at the 2006 Commonwealth Games